Sotirios Manolopoulos (alternate spelling: Sotiris) (Greek: Σωτήρης Μανωλόπουλος; born November 16, 1987) is a Greek Cypriot professional basketball player for AEK Larnaca of the Cypriot League. He is 2.08 m (6 ft 10 in) tall. He plays at the power forward position.

Professional career
Some of the clubs that Manolopoulos has played with during his pro career include: PAOK, Bàsquet Mallorca, Palencia Baloncesto, AEL 1964, Gestibérica Vigo, Kolossos, Peristeri, Kavala, Ikaros and Aris. He rejoined Kolossos Rodou in 2014.

On June 18, 2017, he moved to Kymis of the Greek Basket League, where he eventually became the team captain.

National team career
Manolopoulos played at the 2003 FIBA Europe Under-16 Championship, and at the 2005 FIBA Europe Under-18 Championship, with the junior national teams of Greece.

References

External links
FIBA Archive Profile
FIBA Europe Profile
EuroCup Profile
RealGM.com Profile
Eurobasket.com Profile
Greek League Profile 
Draftexpress.com Profile

1987 births
Living people
A.E.L. 1964 B.C. players
Aries Trikala B.C. players
Aris B.C. players
Bàsquet Mallorca players
Ciudad de Vigo Básquet players
Greek expatriate basketball people in Spain
Greek men's basketball players
Ifaistos Limnou B.C. players
Ikaros B.C. players
Iraklis Thessaloniki B.C. players
Kavala B.C. players
Kolossos Rodou B.C. players
Kymis B.C. players
P.A.O.K. BC players
Palencia Baloncesto players
Peristeri B.C. players
Power forwards (basketball)
Basketball players from Thessaloniki